Mujinga Kambundji (born 17 June 1992) is a Swiss sprinter. She won the bronze medal in the 200 metres at the 2019 World Championships. Kambundji is the 60 metres 2022 World indoor champion, becoming the joint fourth-fastest woman of all time in the event, after earning a bronze in 2018. She is a three-time European Championships medallist, with gold for the 200 m and silver for the 100 m in 2022, and bronze for the 100 m in 2016. At the European Indoor Championships, she earned gold in the 60 m in 2023 and bronze in 2017.

Kambundji is the Swiss record holder for the 100 m and 200 m, and the Swiss indoor record holder for the 60 m. She won almost 30 national titles.

Early life and family
Born in Bern to a Congolese father, Safuka, and a Bernese mother, Ruth, Mujinga Kambundji is the second of four children. Her younger sister Ditaji is also an international athlete and has represented Switzerland at the 2020 Tokyo Olympics.

Career
In 2009, Kambundji won the silver medal in the 100 metres and the gold medal in the 4 × 100 m relay at the European Youth Olympic Festival, and gold medals in the 100 and 200 metres at the Swiss championships. For this, she was elected Swiss Athlete of the Year by the Swiss Athletics Association. In 2010, she won the 200 m in the Second League of the European Team Championships, and broke the Swiss U20 record in the event at the U20 World Championships.

Kambundji trained with the ST Bern athletics club and was coached by Jacques Cordey. In the autumn of 2013 she moved to Mannheim to train under coach Valerij Bauer alongside former European champion Verena Sailer.

At the 2014 European Athletics Championships in Zürich, she broke her own national record in the heats and semi-finals of the 100 metres competition before finishing fourth in the final. She subsequently finished fifth and broke Regula Aebi's 26-year-old national record in the 200 metres final.

Kambundji qualified for the Swiss team at the 2016 Summer Olympics in Rio de Janeiro, reaching the semi-finals of both the 100 m and the 200 m events. Earlier in the same year, she had won bronze in the 100 m competition at the European Championships in Amsterdam.

At the 2017 World Championships in London, Kambundji finished 10th in the 100 m competition. In the 4 × 100 m relay event, she and her teammates Ajla Del Ponte, Sarah Atcho and Salomé Kora improved the national record in the semi-finals and finished fifth in the final. At the end of the year, Kambundji announced that she will work with Dutch coach Henk Kraaijenhof in the future. Their working relationship was terminated after only two months, however.

At the 2018 World Indoor Championships in Birmingham, Kambundji finished third in the 60 m final to win bronze. At the European Championships in Berlin, she finished fourth in the 100 m as well as in the 200 m and in the 4 × 100 m relay (with Ajla Del Ponte, Sarah Atcho and Salomé Kora).

At the 2019 World Championships held in Doha, Qatar, Kambundji finished third in the 200 m competition.

At the delayed 2020 Tokyo Olympics, Kambundji qualified for the finals in both 100 m and 200 m sprints, finishing sixth in the former and seventh in the latter event. She was also part of the Swiss 4 x 100 m relay team that finished fourth in the final.

She won the gold medal in the 60 m at the 2022 World Indoor Championships held in Belgrade in a time of 6.96 seconds, putting her joint-fourth on the world all-time list; a rare feat racing from lane eight. No woman had run faster over the distance since 1999.

On 19 August 2022, Kambundji won the gold medal in the 200 m at the European Athletics Championships in Munich with a time of 22.32 s, after winning silver in the 100 m in 10.99 s behind Germany's Gina Lückenkemper three days earlier.

Miscellaneous
ETH Zurich student organization Swissloop's entry to the 2018 edition of the Hyperloop competition was a transport capsule named Mujinga, after Kambundji.

Achievements

Personal bests

International competitions

1Did not finish in the final

National titles
 Swiss Athletics Championships
 100 metres: 2009, 2011, 2012, 2013, 2014, 2015, 2016, 2017, 2019, 2021, 2022
 200 metres: 2009, 2012, 2013, 2014, 2015, 2017, 2019
 Swiss Indoor Athletics Championships
 60 metres indoor: 2014, 2015, 2016, 2017, 2018, 2019, 2022, 2023
 200 metres indoor: 2011

References

External links

Competition records of Mujinga Kambundji, European Athletics Association
Competition records of Mujinga Kambundji, ST Bern

Living people
Swiss female sprinters
Sportspeople from Bern
1992 births
Athletes (track and field) at the 2012 Summer Olympics
Athletes (track and field) at the 2016 Summer Olympics
Olympic athletes of Switzerland
Swiss people of Democratic Republic of the Congo descent
World Athletics Championships athletes for Switzerland
World Athletics Championships medalists
World Athletics Indoor Championships winners
European Athletics Championships winners
Athletes (track and field) at the 2020 Summer Olympics
Olympic female sprinters
20th-century Swiss women
21st-century Swiss women